Sab Kushal Mangal is a 2020 Indian Hindi-language romantic comedy film directed by Karan Vishwanath Kashyap starring Akshaye Khanna, two newcomers Priyank Sharma and Riva Kishan. It was theatrically released in India on 3 January 2020.

Plot
Pappu, a reality show creator, and a corrupt politician lock horns over Pappu's sensational work. Complications ensue further when they fall for the same girl.

Cast
 Akshaye Khanna as Baba Bhandari
 Priyank Sharma as Pappu Mishra
 Riva Kishan as Mandira
 Satish Kaushik as Mishraji 
 Supriya Pathak as Emarti Devi Mishra
 Rakesh Bedi Mandira's father
 Jaya Ojha as Mandira's mother
 Mrunal Jain as Vishnu
 Swati Semwal as Urmila
 Sunita Shitole as Mandira's grandmother
 Yuvika Chaudhary as Neelu
 Ishtiyak Khan as Sonu
 Apurva Nemlekar as Shyama
 Nalneesh Neel as Haricharan 
 Mukesh Bhatt as Police inspector
 Shriya Saran (Item number in song "Naya Naya Love")

Release
It was theatrically released in India on 3 January 2020.

Soundtrack

The film's music is composed by Harshit Saxena while lyrics written by Sameer Anjaan.

References

External links
 
 
 

2020 films
2020s Hindi-language films
Indian romantic comedy films
2020 romantic comedy films
Films scored by Harshit Saxena